Rekia Boyd was a 22-year-old black American woman who was fatally shot in Chicago, Illinois by Dante Servin, an off-duty Hispanic Chicago police detective, on March 21, 2012.

Killing
Servin, an off-duty police officer, drove his car to Douglass Park on the West Side of Chicago after calling the police to make a noise complaint. He then approached a group of four individuals who had been partying in the park and had some form of verbal altercation with them. One of the victims, Antonio Cross, alleged that he believed Servin was looking for a drug dealer, to which Cross allegedly told Servin to get his "crackhead ass" out of there.

Servin fired on the group, hitting Rekia Boyd in the head, and Antonio Cross in the hand. Initially the Chicago police department claimed that Servin had discharged his weapon after Cross had approached him with a gun. The Boyd family quickly responded that the object was in fact a cell phone. No weapon was ever recovered from the scene.

Aftermath
In November 2013, Servin was charged with involuntary manslaughter, but was cleared of all charges on April 20, 2015, by Judge Dennis J. Porter in a rare directed verdict. Porter's reasoning was that since the shooting was intentional, Servin could not be charged with recklessness. "It is intentional and the crime, if any there be, is first-degree murder," said Porter in his ruling. Following this ruling, Servin could not be charged with murder due to double jeopardy protections.

Servin claimed he fired because someone in the group was holding a gun, but it was actually only a cellphone. 
In November 2015, Chicago Mayor Rahm Emanuel and police superintendent Garry McCarthy both suggested that Dante Servin should be fired by the Chicago Police Board. The city paid $4.5 million to Boyd's family to settle a wrongful-death lawsuit. 

Servin resigned on May 17, 2016, two days before the departmental hearing which was to decide whether he should be fired.

In November 2019, Servin requested that the case be expunged from his record. The request was denied by a judge, as was a subsequent request to seal the case's records.

Protests
The ruling sparked some public protest. The Black Lives Matter movement has protested the deaths of black girls and women at the hands of police, including Boyd's.

References

2012 deaths
2012 in Illinois
2010s in Chicago
Deaths by firearm in Illinois
History of Chicago
African Americans shot dead by law enforcement officers in the United States
Protests in the United States
Black Lives Matter
March 2012 events in the United States
Victims of police brutality in the United States
Law enforcement controversies in the United States